Major Ritchie and Anthony Wilding were the defending champions, but Wilding did not participate. Ritchie partnered with Charles Dixon but they lost in the quarterfinals to Herbert Roper Barrett and Arthur Gore.

Barrett and Gore defeated Stanley Doust and Harry Parker 6–2, 6–1, 6–4 in the all comers' final to win the gentlemen's doubles tennis title at the 1909 Wimbledon Championships.

Draw

All comers' finals

Top half

Section 1

Section 2

Bottom half

Section 3

Section 4

References

External links

Men's Doubles
Wimbledon Championship by year – Men's doubles